Arizona's 17th Legislative District is one of 30 in the state, situated in Maricopa County. As of 2021, there are 40 precincts in the district, with a total registered voter population of 163,279. The district has an overall population of 230,762.

Political representation
The district is represented for the 2021–2022 Legislative Session in the State Senate by J. D. Mesnard (R) and in the House of Representatives by Jeff Weninger (R) and Jennifer Pawlik (D).

See also
 List of Arizona Legislative Districts
 Arizona State Legislature

References

External links
  (Information based on U.S. Census Bureau's American Community Survey).
 
 

Maricopa County, Arizona
Arizona legislative districts